Chordifex is a genus of plants in the Restionaceae described as a genus in 1998. The entire genus is endemic to Australia.

 species

References

Restionaceae
Poales genera
Endemic flora of Australia
Taxa named by Barbara G. Briggs
Taxa named by Lawrence Alexander Sidney Johnson
Taxa described in 1998